Borodai or Boroday (Ukrainian, Russian: Бородай) is a Ukrainian-language surname. It may refer to:

Alexander Borodai (born 1972), Russian politician
 (born 1947), Russian cosmonaut
Oleh Boroday (born 1993), Ukrainian footballer
Oleksandr Borodai (1844–1919), Ukrainian and American bandurist
 (born 1972), Russian Olympic archer
Vasyl Borodai (1917–2010), Ukrainian sculptor

See also
 

Ukrainian-language surnames